Arapaho Pass may refer to:
 Arapaho Pass (Front Range), a mountain pass on the Continental Divide of the Americas in the Front Range of Colorado, United States.
 Arapaho Pass (Rabbit Ears Range), a mountain pass in the Rabbit Ears Range of Colorado, United States.

See also